Elkhorn is an unincorporated community and census-designated place (CDP) in Monterey County, California, United States.

The settled part of the community now occupies the hills to the east of the railroad. The population of the Elkhorn CDP was 1,588 at the 2020 census. Local understandings of the extent of Elkhorn may vary from the Census definition.

Elkhorn was named after the elk in the area that have since gone extinct.

Geography
The community receives mail within the ZIP Code areas of 95012 (Castroville) and 93907 (Prunedale / Salinas). Elkhorn Slough, the largest tidal salt marsh in the area outside of San Francisco Bay, borders the northwest side of the community. The Elkhorn Slough National Estuarine Research Reserve promotes education about and preservation of the salt marsh environs.

Streets
Main county roads include Castroville Boulevard, Dolan Road, Elkhorn Road, and Meridian Road. Castroville Boulevard leads southwest to Highway 156 and east to the Prunedale area and U.S. Route 101. Dolan Road leads west to Highway 1. Minor county roads include Del Monte Farms, Bayview Road, Walker Valley Road, Long Valley Road, Amaral Road, Paradise Canyon Road.

Demographics

2010
At the 2010 census Elkhorn had a population of 1,565. The racial makeup of Elkhorn was 1,122 (71.7%) White, 9 (0.6%) African American, 7 (0.4%) Native American, 63 (4.0%) Asian, 3 (0.2%) Pacific Islander, 286 (18.3%) from other races, and 75 (4.8%) from two or more races. Hispanic or Latino of any race were 588 people (37.6%).

The whole population lived in households, no one lived in non-institutionalized group quarters and no one was institutionalized.

There were 532 households, 183 (34.4%) had children under the age of 18 living in them, 329 (61.8%) were opposite-sex married couples living together, 58 (10.9%) had a female householder with no husband present, 27 (5.1%) had a male householder with no wife present.  There were 33 (6.2%) unmarried opposite-sex partnerships, and 2 (0.4%) same-sex married couples or partnerships. 95 households (17.9%) were one person and 29 (5.5%) had someone living alone who was 65 or older. The average household size was 2.94.  There were 414 families (77.8% of households); the average family size was 3.21.

The age distribution was 364 people (23.3%) under the age of 18, 149 people (9.5%) aged 18 to 24, 349 people (22.3%) aged 25 to 44, 519 people (33.2%) aged 45 to 64, and 184 people (11.8%) who were 65 or older.  The median age was 41.5 years. For every 100 females, there were 97.4 males.  For every 100 females age 18 and over, there were 97.5 males.

There were 565 housing units at an average density of 117.0 per square mile, of the occupied units 380 (71.4%) were owner-occupied and 152 (28.6%) were rented. The homeowner vacancy rate was 1.3%; the rental vacancy rate was 0.6%.  1,098 people (70.2% of the population) lived in owner-occupied housing units and 467 people (29.8%) lived in rental housing units.

2000
At the 2000 census there were 1,591 people, 523 households, and 411 families in the CDP. Most residents live in detached single family homes with land, individual and shared water wells and leach fields. The racial makeup of the CDP was 72.16% White, 1.01% Black or African American, 0.63% Native American, 3.83% Asian, 0.13% Pacific Islander, 18.29% from other races, and 3.96% from two or more races.  27.91% of the population were Hispanic or Latino of any race.
Of the 523 households 35.4% had children under the age of 18 living with them, 65.8% were married couples living together, 8.8% had a female householder with no husband present, and 21.4% were non-families. 14.1% of households were one person and 3.3% were one person aged 65 or older.  The average household size was 3.04 and the average family size was 3.34.

The age distribution was 25.7% under the age of 18, 7.6% from 18 to 24, 29.0% from 25 to 44, 28.5% from 45 to 64, and 9.2% 65 or older.  The median age was 38 years. For every 100 females, there were 103.7 males.  For every 100 females age 18 and over, there were 104.5 males.

The median household income was $70,370 and the median family income  was $71,296. Males had a median income of $40,662 versus $36,274 for females. The per capita income for the CDP was $24,999.  About 4.5% of families and 9.8% of the population were below the poverty line, including 5.7% of those under age 18 and 15.2% of those age 65 or over.

Economy

Agricultural is a major part of Elkhorn's small economy. Strawberries and artichokes are key crops. Most Elkhorn residents work in the surrounding areas of Castroville, Prunedale, and Moss Landing, and in the nearby larger towns of Watsonville, Salinas, and Monterey.  Elkhorn shares zip codes with nearby Castroville and Prunedale. Elkhorn has limited business and retail services.  The only retail service in Elkhorn is the Elkhorn Superette which is located on the west side of Elkhorn Road, just north of Bayview Road. The nearest business and retail center is located about three miles (5 km) away in Castroville.  However, many Elkhorn residents travel about 20 minutes to the nearby cities for greater retail and service needs such as department stores, movie theaters, and health services which are not located in Castroville.

Government
As an unincorporated area, Elkhorn is administered by the Monterey County Board of Supervisors. Elkhorn is part of District 2, whose current supervisor is Louis R. Calcagno.  The Board is responsible for providing all local public services.  Elkhorn is located in the Coastal Zone and all new development is subject to approval by the California Coastal Commission.

Education
Elkhorn Elementary School is the only school located in Elkhorn, and it serves the surrounding K-6 student population. Elkhorn Elementary is the polling site for Elkhorn voters. Middle school students in grades 7 and 8 currently attend North Monterey County Middle School and high school students in grades 9-12 attend North Monterey County High School, both located in Castroville. All local public schools are part of the North Monterey County Unified School District .

Gallery

References

Census-designated places in Monterey County, California
Census-designated places in California